Mossy Point is a suburb in Eurobodalla Shire, New South Wales, Australia. It lies on the Tasman Sea coast to the north of Broulee, separated by Candlagan Creek. It is about 14 km northeast of Moruya and 290 km south of Sydney.

References

Towns in New South Wales
Towns in the South Coast (New South Wales)
Eurobodalla Shire
Coastal towns in New South Wales